The 2006 Great Alaska Shootout was held November 22, 2006, through November 24, 2006 at Sullivan Arena in Anchorage, Alaska

Brackets 
* – Denotes overtime period

Men's

Women's

References

Great Alaska Shootout
Great Alaska Shootout
Great Alaska Shootout
Great Alaska Shootout
Great Alaska Shootout